Georgy Nekhaev (born May 6, 1960 in Gomel) is a Belarusian sport shooter. He competed in rifle shooting events at the Summer Olympics in 1996 and 2000.

Olympic results

References

1960 births
Living people
ISSF rifle shooters
Belarusian male sport shooters
Olympic shooters of Belarus
Shooters at the 1996 Summer Olympics
Shooters at the 2000 Summer Olympics
Sportspeople from Gomel